Sing Party (formerly just SiNG, and stylized as SiNG PARTY) is a music party video game developed by Nintendo and FreeStyleGames and published by Nintendo for the Wii U. It is a karaoke-style game and was released on the Wii U's launch day in North America, and in Europe in January 2013.

The retail game comes bundled with an official Wii U karaoke microphone, which will also be sold separately. A microphone is required for all versions of the game, including those who download the game from the Nintendo eShop. Previous licensed microphones used with singing games for Wii are also compatible with this game.

Gameplay
Like other karaoke games, players would sing to the lyrics of the available songs and get scored based on their rhythm, however Sing Party permits multiple people to play along with the lead singing player.

The game includes a variety of different modes. In Party Mode, lead singers read the song lyrics on the Wii U GamePad, allowing them to face the other players, which represent the lead singers' audience, and the lead singers can move around the room instead of staring at the television screen. The other players joins in the fun by following the cues from the physical performance of the lead singers, singing the background vocals and dancing along with the moves shown on the television screen.

In Sing Mode, players can sing by themselves or as a duet with harmonies. As the song is performed, their vocal qualities are scored and evaluated on the TV in real time.

In Team Mode, players can split into two groups, which lets players face off against their musical rivals as they rotate through different game modes.

Track list
The following is a list of the 50 songs available in the game. Since Sing Party is online-enabled and connects to the Nintendo Network, Nintendo advertised releasing future songs as DLC in early 2013, though none was ever released.

Reception

Sing Party has received mixed reviews. The game received a score of 60/100 on review aggregator website Metacritic, indicating “mixed or average reviews”. IGN has given the game a 6.3 out of 10, saying that "while one person steps up as the main performer, others can dance, sing and clap along with the prompts on the TV screen making sure everyone at the party is rocking out together." Nintendo Life gave the game a 5/10 score, praising the flashy graphics but criticizing the game for lacking identity and being mediocre.

References

External links
 

2012 video games
Karaoke video games
Nintendo games
Nintendo Network games
Party video games
Video games developed in the United Kingdom
Wii U eShop games
Wii U games
Wii U-only games
Video games using Havok